Lachendorf is a Samtgemeinde ("collective municipality") in the district of Celle, in Lower Saxony, Germany. Its seat is in Lachendorf.

The Samtgemeinde Lachendorf consists of the following municipalities:

 Ahnsbeck 
 Beedenbostel 
 Eldingen 
 Hohne 
 Lachendorf

Samtgemeinden in Lower Saxony
Celle (district)